The Stolen Death is a 1938 Finnish thriller film directed by Nyrki Tapiovaara. The story is set in the Grand Duchy of Finland in 1904, and is about a group of Finnish activists in Helsinki who develop into a revolutionary force for Finnish independence. The film is based on the 1919 short story "The Meat-Grinder" by Runar Schildt. Unlike the original story, the film is not set during the 1918 Finnish Civil War because of its sensitive subject at the time, but the events were set during the Russo-Japanese War instead.

The film was released on 4 September 1938.

Cast
 Tuulikki Paananen as Manja
 Ilmari Mänty as Robert Hedman
 Santeri Karilo as Jonni Claesson
 Annie Mörk as madame Johansson
 Bertha Lindberg as Robert's mother
 Hertta Leistén as aunt
 Gabriel Tossu as shoemaker
 Jalmari Parikka as prison guard
 Aku Peltonen as morgue guard
 Atos Konst as Robert's comrade
 Viljo Kervinen as Robert's comrade
 Paavo Kuoppala as Robert's comrade
 Yrjö Salminen as Robert's comrade
 Kusti Laitinen as gendarme officer
 Emil Kokkonen as soldier

References

Further reading

External links
 
 

1938 thriller films
1938 films
Films based on short fiction
Films directed by Nyrki Tapiovaara
Films set in 1904
1930s Finnish-language films
Finnish black-and-white films
Finnish thriller films